In mathematics, simplicial category may refer to:
 Simplex category, the category of finite ordinals and order-preserving functions
 Simplicially enriched category, a category enriched over the category of simplicial sets
 Simplicial object in the category of categories